Babaçulândia is a municipality in the state of Tocantins, Brazil.

Babaçulândia was founded on 1 January 1954.
The most recent population figure as of 2020 was 10,666 people.
The municipality includes the buffer zone of the Tocantins Fossil Trees Natural Monument.

References

Municipalities in Tocantins
1954 establishments in Brazil